Riesel may refer to:

People
 Hans Riesel (1929–2014), Swedish mathematician who discovered a Mersenne prime
 Victor Riesel (1913–1995), American labor union journalist

In Mathematics
 Riesel number, an odd natural number k for which the integers of the form k·2n−1 are all composite
 Riesel Sieve, a project to prove the smallest Riesel number

Places
 Riesel, Texas